Vitaphone Varieties is a series title (represented by a pennant logo on screen) used for all of Warner Bros.', earliest short film "talkies" of the 1920s, initially made using the Vitaphone sound on disc process before a switch to the sound-on-film format early in the 1930s. These were the first major film studio-backed sound films, initially showcased with the 1926 synchronized scored features Don Juan and The Better 'Ole. Although independent producers like Lee de Forest's Phonofilm were successfully making sound film shorts as early as 1922, they were very limited in their distribution and their audio was generally not as loud and clear in theaters as Vitaphone's. The success of the early Vitaphone shorts, initially filmed only in New York, helped launch the sound revolution in Hollywood.

Overview 
The series featured were many of the great vaudeville and musical performers of the 1920s. Classical musicians who dominated the early days of recorded sound made their film debuts, along with the many future stars of radio's "golden age": Fred Allen, Jack Benny, George Burns, Gracie Allen, Edgar Bergen, Jack Haley just to name a few. Several top stars at Warner Bros. and other studios like Joe E. Brown, Joan Blondell, William Demarest, Claire Trevor, Sylvia Sidney, Humphrey Bogart and Spencer Tracy first appeared on screen in ten-minute dramatic and comedy sketches, as did a few silent stars making the transition like Blanche Sweet.

Al Jolson filmed A Plantation Act in August 1926, a full year before The Jazz Singer. When Warner Brothers decided to promote the feature as Jolson's talkie debut, the earlier short was removed from circulation. Initially thought lost, it was restored, in part by the Vitaphone Project's efforts, for a laser disc set in the 1990s and later released on DVD with the feature.

At the time, there was much fear that these little films (and the sound features that followed) would kill vaudeville, a fear that was justified for many individual performers. While there was always a chance that a stage performer could become a household name by appearing in these, his or her act could no longer be repeated on stage, town after town, once one filmed performance appeared in theaters across the country. A few comedy acts for Vitaphone even made light of this fact, particularly Georgie Price’s 1929 title, Don't Get Nervous.

Although the term "Vitaphone Variety" was still used with some Warner film shorts running under one reel (or 10 minutes) well into the 1950s, the trade periodicals marketed them under different logos after the 1931–32 season: Pepper Pots and Vitaphone Novelties (after 1936), while lengthier productions (running two reels or 20 minutes) morphed into the Broadway Brevities. By this time, the primary producer in charge was Samuel Sax, who oversaw the majority of the New York filmed productions. Later titles completed in California in the forties and fifties sometimes recycled the "Vitaphone Variety" logo, but were usually marketed in the trade periodicals as either "Hollywood Novelties" or "Warner Novelties" and were mostly documentary rather than musical or comedy acts. Among this later group, two 1945-46 titles, Story of a Dog and Smart as a Fox, were nominees for the Academy Award for Best Live Action Short Film in the one-reel category.

Recent rediscovery 
The impact that the earliest Vitaphone Varieties had on world cinema has been a frequent footnote in many film history books, but it was only in recent decades that books have bothered to analyze them in depth (among them, Roy Liebman's Vitaphone Films and  Edwin M. Bradley's The First Hollywood Sound Shorts, 1926–1931).

The Vitaphone Project only started in 1991 rounding up missing discs and matching them with films made before the studio switched to optical film soundtracks. Three years later, MGM/UA issued the first group of them to laser disc, with Warner releasing the first significant number on DVD as part of a multi-disc edition of The Jazz Singer. Since then, the Warner Archive Collection has made more available in a series of sets, as well as re-releasing Don Juan with its accompanying shorts.

List of Vitaphone Varieties 
The following list is not complete but fairly close. The 1926–1932 titles (the official "Vitaphone Varieties") are arranged by the Vitaphone title card numbers. They are then grouped by the year in which they were filmed, but not necessarily the same year they were released to theaters. If known, that date is listed right after the major credits (just the key director, if known, and the performers). Sometimes the date Film Daily reviewed it or the copyright date (©) is listed. DVD availability is also listed at the end of each line.

1926 
Listed by Vitaphone number. Filmed in 1926 in New York City.

1927 
Listed by Vitaphone number. Filmed in 1927 both in Brooklyn (NYC) and Hollywood (LA)

1928 
Listed by Vitaphone number. Filmed in 1928 in Hollywood unless marked (NYC)

1929 
Filmed in 1929 in Hollywood (LA) and Brooklyn (NYC).

1930 
Filmed in 1930 in Hollywood (LA) and Brooklyn (NYC).

1931 
Filmed in 1931 in Brooklyn, New York.

1932

Vitaphone Varieties in Technicolor (1929–1930) 
Warners Brothers and its Vitaphone and First National subsidiaries produced more features and shorts in two-strip Technicolor during the late twenties and early thirties than any other studio. Unfortunately not all of them survive in their original format as black and white TV prints are sometimes the remaining available ones. The following were filmed in Hollywood in the fall of 1929 through the spring of 1930. One title, Bubbles, is available in black and white form on Meet Me In St. Louis (2-disc) DVD & Vitaphone Cavalcade of Musical Comedy Shorts (Warner Archive) DVD

Assorted Vitaphone promotionals and commercials 

Not a complete list, but a select number of 1926–1931 shorts of interest

 The Birth of the Telephone / Thomas A. Watson (former assistant to Alexander Graham Bell) / June 1926
 Reverend J. Ford and Reverend H. Hickman: 100th anniversary of Jamestown, New York / June 1927
 Special Star Number for Theater Opening / Al Jolson / December 1928
 Voice of Vitaphone / August 1929 / Short reel numbered #877
 Intimate Dinner in Celebration of Warner Bros. Silver Jubilee / John G. Adolfi (director) / August 1930 / The Jazz Singer DVD
 Chesterfield Celebrities / Clark & McCullough / January 18, 1931 / 22 minute special
 Graduation Day in Bugland / animated cartoon / March 1, 1931
 Slopes of the Andes / March 29, 1931 / commercial for American Coffee

Pepper Pots (1931–1936) 

"Pepper Pots" replaced "Vitaphone Varieties" as a marketing name for Warner's black & white one-reel (running under 11 minutes) shorts released between 1931 and 1936. These included comedy acts, a series spotlighting famous songwriters and a number of sports, animal subjects and other human-interest documentary films.

Vitaphone "Novelties" and revived Vitaphone Varieties (1936–1939) 

All of these are black and white shorts, running under 11 minutes and completed at the Brooklyn (NYC) facilities.

Hollywood Novelties / Warner Novelties (1940–1953) 

Most of these were completed in California, explaining the change in series name. In the mid-forties, the studio reverted to the old "Vitaphone Varieties" logo with a number of titles, although these black and white documentaries (all running 8–11 minutes in length) were very different than the twenties and thirties musical and comedy acts. After a few years absence, they were revived as "Warner Novelties", consisting mostly of newsreel and earlier recycled footage stretching past the decades. Excluded from the following list (for space reasons) are the first two Joe McDoakes comedies of 1942 that were issued under the Hollywood Novelty logo, those featuring archery expert Howard Hill and compilation director Robert Youngson. See their articles for further information.

See also 

 List of vaudeville performers: A-K (many appearing in the films)
 List of vaudeville performers: L-Z
 Sound film
 Vitaphone
 Warner Bros.
 List of short subjects by Hollywood studio#Warner Brothers

Notes

References 
 
 
 
 
 Motion Pictures 1912–1939 Catalog of Copyright Entries 1951 Library of Congress 
 Motion Pictures 1940–1949 Catalog of Copyright Entries 1953 Library of Congress 
 Motion Pictures 1950–1959 Catalog of Copyright Entries 1960 Library of Congress 
 BoxOffice back issue scans available

External links 
 The Vitaphone Project
 Restoration of A Plantation Act in detail
 Film Daily links
 individual titles covered in more detail on the IMDb.com
 Pepper Pots on IMDb.com
 Silent Era site listing includes many Vitaphone shorts of the twenties

Vitaphone short films
Warner Bros. short films